Christ Gospel Church is a fundamentalist, Pentecostal Christian denomination. It was founded in the 1950s by Berniece R. Hicks and fellow believers starting in a small Christian mission in Louisville, Kentucky.

Doctrines

The Christ Gospel Churches affirm their acceptance of the Apostles' Creed as an expression of Christian faith. Their Pentecostal emphasis is seen in teaching the baptism of the Holy Spirit with the evidence of glossolalia, or speaking in tongues (Acts 2:4,11,38).¹ However, they do not believe that evidence of glossolalia is a requirement for salvation; rather, it is a gift that Christians can accept as they desire. The church also teaches that water baptism by immersion is a commandment for all Christians (Acts 2:38; 8:12; 9:5,18).¹  The church believes that worship should embrace all kinds of music (e.g., traditional hymns, choruses, country gospel, urban gospel, classical) and musical instruments (e.g., drums, guitars, pianos, saxophones, trumpets, violins). The church welcomes all races and classes of people because it realizes the importance of people being united in Christ rather than being divided among themselves. The church teaches "old-fashioned Holiness" in matters of conduct and dress, such as refraining from watching television or attending movie theaters, and women wearing dresses or skirts rather than pants. 
The emphasis of Hicks' teachings is that the Bible is the infallible Word of God and that it calls on Christians to grow to spiritual maturity, both in their moral development and in their spiritual love relationship with Jesus Christ, in order to be in the Bride of Christ. The core of her distinctive approach to Scripture is founded on the principle that the Old Testament Tabernacle was laid out in the form of a cross and serves as a picture or metaphor of Christian believers' spiritual experiences as they grow to maturity in Christ Jesus, as taught in the New Testament (Hebrews 9:8-11; Ephesians 2:19-22).

A related core principle is that the Lord Jesus Christ is the Head over all things and that all things work together for good to those who love the Lord. These concepts can be found throughout Hicks's numerous publications and in church teachings.

International outreach
Mission outreach is an important part of Christ Gospel Churches' ministry.

Over 1500 churches world-wide are affiliated with Christ Gospel Churches International Inc (CGCII).  Each country's Christ Gospel affiliated organization is an independent legal entity run by local church leaders.  All follow the ecclesiastical model of faith expressed by Christ Gospel Churches International Inc.

Support for Mexico ministries is a major focus of Christ Gospel Churches International, Inc.

Christ Gospel Church is among the fastest growing evangelical groups in Mexico. Today, there are over 500 churches, an orphans' home, and two Bible schools.

CGCII provides seed funds to many local affiliated churches world-wide for the development of Christian congregations, church buildings, and many charitable works. Depending on local needs, CGCII also supports schools, orphanages, and feeding programs in Haiti, India, and Africa.

Distribution

Christ Gospel Churches International claims some 70 congregations in the United States, over 400 in India, about 500 in Mexico, and affiliates in several countries of Africa and Central America. There are congregations in El Salvador, England, the Faroe Islands, Germany, Guatemala, Haiti, Iceland, Ireland, Jamaica, Japan, Mongolia, New Zealand, the Netherlands, the Philippines, Romania, Russia, Spain, South Africa, Sweden, and various countries of South America, including Colombia and Ecuador. In all, the movement claims over 1,400 affiliated congregations in 135 countries (2008). Its international offices are located in Jeffersonville, Indiana, where it operates a Bible Institute, publishing ministry, broadcast ministry, and audio ministry. The church also publishes a quarterly newsletter, Voice of Hope.

References
 	
Hicks, B.R. Articles of Faith. Christ Gospel Churches International, 1991. 
Hicks, B.R. Confirming Our Faith in the Lord Jesus Christ. Christ Gospel Churches International.

References

External links
Official Web Site
What Does Christ Gospel Church Teach?

Pentecostal denominations
New religious movements
Religious organizations established in the 1950s